Semiletka is a rural locality (a selo) and the administrative centre of Semiletovsky Selsoviet, Dyurtyulinsky District, Bashkortostan, Russia. The population was 3,977 as of 2010. There are 20 streets.

Geography 
Semiletka is located 29 km southwest of Dyurtyuli (the district's administrative centre) by road. Verkhnemancharovo is the nearest rural locality.

References 

Rural localities in Dyurtyulinsky District